Daniel Curry is a visual effects producer and supervisor, as well as a main title designer in the film and television industry.

Curry attended Middlebury College in Vermont and graduate school at Humboldt State University in California.

He is best known for his work on Star Trek: The Next Generation, Star Trek: Deep Space Nine, Star Trek: Voyager, and Star Trek: Enterprise. His work on these series earned him fifteen Emmy Award nominations and seven Emmy awards wins. "Birthright, Part II" was the only episode directed by visual effects supervisor Dan Curry. As Visual Effects supervisor, Curry frequently served as a second unit director. He directed an episode himself on only one occasion, the Star Trek: The Next Generation episode "Birthright, Part II". 

Starting on TNG, Curry used his experience as a martial artist to develop a fighting style for the fictional alien race known as the Klingons. He designed several Klingon hand-to-hand combat weapons, including the Sword of Kahless, the mek'leth, and—most notably—the bat'leth.

In addition to designing the title sequence for Star Trek Voyager, Curry has designed many memorable title sequences for feature films, including Top Gun, Big Trouble in Little China, and Three Amigos. He has also worked as visual effects supervisor on the television series Chuck.

As of 2015, Curry sits on the board of directors for the Hollywood Science Fiction Museum.

References

External links
 Dan Curry's Official Website
 Biography of Dan Curry
 Art of Dan Curry
 
 Interview with Dan Curry (Aug 2006)

Year of birth missing (living people)
Living people
Emmy Award winners
American scenic designers
Film and television title designers
Middlebury College alumni
California State Polytechnic University, Humboldt alumni